Otto IV of Schaumburg (1517 – 21 December 1576) was a German nobleman. He was a ruling Count of Schauenburg and of Holstein-Pinneberg. He was a son of Jobst I and his wife Mary of Nassau-Siegen, a daughter of Count John V of Nassau-Siegen.

He adopted the teachings of Martin Luther. However, with respect to his elder brothers Cologne's Archbishop-Electors Adolphus III (reg. 1547–1556) and Anthony I (reg. 1557-1558) he refrained from open confrontation. In 1559 he officially began the Reformation in Schauenburg and Holstein-Pinneberg. These areas remained Lutheran throughout the Counter-Reformation and into modern times.

Marriages and issue
Otto first married Mary (*1527–1554*), daughter of Duke Barnim XI of Pomerania-Stettin. Mary and Otto had four sons:
 Hermann (*1545–1592*), Prince-Bishop of Minden (1566–1581)
 Otto (*1545–1572*), (mentally insane)
 Adolphus XIV (*1547–1601*), count regnant in Schaumburg and Holstein-Pinneberg. married to Elisabeth of Brunswick-Wolfenbüttel (1567–1618).
 Anthony (*1549–1599*), Prince-Bishop of Minden (1587–1599)

In 1558 Otto married a second time, with Elisabeth Ursula (*1539–1586*), a daughter of Ernest I, Duke of Brunswick-Lüneburg. Elisabeth Ursula and Otto had two daughters and one son:
 Mary (*1559–1616*) married in 1591 Count Josse of Limburg-Styrum (*1560–1621*)
 Elisabeth, married in 1585 Count Simon VI of Lippe (*1554-1613*)
 Ernest (*1569–1622*), count regnant of Schaumburg and Holstein-Pinneberg as of 1601, elevated to Prince of Schaumburg in 1619.

See also
Martin Luther

References

External links
Catholic Encyclopedia article about the Counts of Schaumburg

People of the Protestant Reformation
Otto 03 Of Hildesheim
1517 births
1576 deaths
Counts of Germany
House of Schauenburg
Otto 03
Counts of Holstein